Patricias Hope was a famous racing greyhound from the 1970s. He is just one of four greyhounds along with Mick the Miller, Rapid Ranger and Westmead Hawk to win the English Greyhound Derby twice.

1972
Patricias Hope won the 1972 English Greyhound Derby when trained by Adam Jackson and owned by Brian Stanley and Gordon and Basil Marks. During the same year he secured the Triple Crown, consisting of the English Greyhound Derby, Scottish Greyhound Derby and Welsh Greyhound Derby. Along with Trev's Perfection and Mile Bush Pride, only one of three greyhounds to do so  and was duly voted 1972 Greyhound of the Year. He was later sent to stud.

1973
In 1973 he returned from stud duties in Ireland (where he had covered some 36 bitches) and successfully defended his title when winning the 1973 English Greyhound Derby for trainer John O'Connor. He became only the second greyhound in history at the time, after Mick the Miller, to claim a second title. The event was broadcast live on ITV's World of Sport and won £12,500, under new sponsors Spillers. John O'Connor had bought Brian Stanley's share in the greyhound and trained him for the 1973 competition.

1974
He was retired to stud in 1974 after failing to secure a record third English Derby.

Retirement
In November 1982 at the age of 12 he was put to sleep at the Hook Estate and Kennels, after losing control of his hind legs.

Pedigree

References

Greyhound racing in the United Kingdom
Racing greyhounds
1970 animal births
1982 animal deaths